Jack Studnicka (born February 18, 1999) is a Canadian professional ice hockey forward for the Vancouver Canucks of the National Hockey League (NHL). Studnicka was drafted in the second round (53rd overall) by the Boston Bruins in the 2017 NHL Entry Draft.

Playing career
Studnicka played junior hockey and was the captain with the Oshawa Generals of the Ontario Hockey League (OHL) from 2015 to 2019. On September 26, 2017 Studnicka signed a three-year, entry-level contract with the Boston Bruins of the National Hockey League (NHL). At the conclusion of the 2017–18 OHL season he joined the Providence Bruins of the American Hockey League (AHL) for the remainder of the season where he tallied one goal and four assists for five points for the remaining five regular season games in the AHL.

During the 2018–19 season, on November 26, 2019, Studnicka made his NHL debut with the Bruins against the Montreal Canadiens. Playing at the Bell Centre in Montreal, he registered an assist making that his first career NHL point, Studnicka went on to play one more game with the Bruins that season before being re-assigned to the Providence Bruins. Over a year later, in Studnicka's fifth game with the Bruins, he scored his first NHL goal in front of no spectators due to public health restrictions as a result of the COVID-19 pandemic.

As a restricted free agent, Studnicka was re-signed by the Bruins to a two-year contract extension on July 23, 2022. 

Studnicka began the 2022–23 season with the Bruins, primarily serving as a healthy scratch and appearing in just one game before he was traded by the Bruins to the Vancouver Canucks in exchange for goaltender Michael DiPietro and defensive prospect Jonathan Myrenberg on October 27, 2022.

Career statistics

Regular season and playoffs

International

Awards and honours

References

External links
 

1999 births
Living people
Boston Bruins draft picks
Boston Bruins players
Canadian ice hockey centres
Ice hockey people from Ontario
Niagara IceDogs players
Oshawa Generals players
People from Essex County, Ontario
Providence Bruins players
Vancouver Canucks players